Samuel Simpson (born ) is an Australian male artistic gymnast, representing his nation at international competitions.  He participated at the 2008 Summer Olympics in Beijing, China.

References

1984 births
Living people
Australian male artistic gymnasts
Place of birth missing (living people)
Gymnasts at the 2008 Summer Olympics
Olympic gymnasts of Australia